The Secretariat of the Pan-African Parliament provides administrative support to the Pan-African Parliament.

Composition
The secretariat is composed of a clerk, currently Yusupha Jobe, and two deputy clerks, currently Gali Massa Harou (legislative business) and Charlotte Marck (finance, administration and international relations).

As head of the secretariat, the clerk supervises it staff, organises elections of presidents and vice presidents, takes minutes of proceedings of parliament and permanent committees and authenticates votes of each sitting by signature. He or she is responsible to parliament for accounting issues and manages its daily administration.

References

Pan-African Parliament
African Union
Pan-African Parliament